Rangbaz is a 2017 Bangladeshi gangster film directed by Shamim Ahamed Roni and Abdul Mannan. It is produced by Shrikant Mohta and Mahendra Soni under the banners of SVF Entertainment and Ruprong Films Limited. The film marks SVF Entertainment's first Bangladeshi venture and it is also the first film of SVF Entertainment to be only releasing in Bangladesh. The film stars Shakib Khan and features Shabnom Bubly as his love interest. It also features Rajatava Dutta, Amit Hasan, Chikon Ali, and Sadek Bachchu in supporting roles. The film was released on 2 September 2017, to coincide with Eid al-Adha in Bangladesh.

The film is also the third collaboration between Khan and Bubly, who have previously starred together in the 2016 films Bossgiri and Shooter.

Cast
 Shakib Khan as Sallu a.k.a. Rangbaz
 Shabnom Bubly as Bubly 
 Amit Hasan as Amit Chowdhury
 Nuton as Noorjahan / Sallu's Mother
 Chikon Ali as Sallu's gang member
 Sadek Bachchu as Chachu
 Kazi Hayat as Dr. Shaab
 Shiba Shanu as Shahadat Juardar
Jadu Azad
Ratan Khan

Production

Filming
The shooting schedule of Rangbaz commenced on 18 April 2017. The first phase of the film was shot in 10-day schedule and entirely filmed in Pabna. The second phase of the filming took place in Dhaka. The last phase of the film was filmed in Dhaka and Pabna, and lasted 30-days. The music of the film was shot at various locations in Switzerland and Italy. A romantic track sequence was shot at Zermatt, Kanton Wallis, Switzerland while other sequences were shot at Venice, Italy and A romantic track sequence was shot at Kolkata film city in East Bengal. The entire film was shot on a 45-day schedule.

Soundtrack

The soundtrack for the film is composed by Savvy and Dabbu. The music video of the first track from the soundtrack, "Ghum Amar", was released on YouTube on 20 August. The second song from the album, "Rangbaz", is the title track of the album. The song's music video was released on YouTube on 24 August. The music video of the third song, "Rim Jhim", released on 27 August and the music video of the fourth song, "Tui Chad Eider", released on 29 August.

Track listing

References

External links 
 
 

2017 films
Bengali-language Bangladeshi films
Bengali-language Indian films
2017 action films
Bangladeshi action films
Films shot in Pabna
Films shot in Dhaka
Bangladeshi gangster films
Films scored by Savvy Gupta
Films scored by Dabbu
Films shot in Switzerland
Films shot in Venice
Films shot in Italy
Bangladeshi films about revenge
2010s Bengali-language films
Films directed by Shamim Ahamed Roni